Leucochromodes bicoloralis is a moth in the family Crambidae. It was described by Harrison Gray Dyar Jr. in 1910. It is found in Guyana.

References

Moths described in 1910
Spilomelinae